In the Bon religion Sipe Gyalmo (Queen of the World) is both a meditational deity and a protector deity.  Despite her fierce appearance, as one of the manifestations of Loving Mother of Wisdom (Sherab Chamma) she embodies wisdom and compassion.  Sherab Chamma, also known as Thugje Chamma (loving mother of compassion) or Tara, is considered to be the mother of all Buddhas and the embodiment of perfect wisdom.  

Sipe Gyalmo has three faces, and six arms holding weapons and symbolic objects.  She has six principal manifestations (white, yellow, red, black, blue, and dark brown) and may be shown riding a black mule or a red mule. The objects in her hands may include a victory banner, a sword or dagger, a mirror, a hook, a trident, a wand, and a skullcup filled with blood.  On a red mule, she is surrounded by flames of wisdom and sits on a flayed human skin symbolizing impermanence.

See also
Tara (Devi)
Tara (Buddhism)
 Tara as a Tantric deity

References 

Bon deities